() are  that invite humans toward death in certain aspects of Japanese religion and culture.  have been described as monsters, helpers, and creatures of darkness.  are used for tales and religions in Japanese culture.

Japanese religion

In Buddhism, there is the Mara that is concerned with death, the Mrtyu-mara. Also, in the Yogacarabhumi-sastra, a writing on Yogacara, a demon decided the time of people's deaths.

However, Izanami and Yama are also thought to be different from the death gods in Western mythology. Some forms of Buddhism do not involve believing in any deities, so it is sometimes thought that the concept of a death god does not exist to begin with. After the war, however, the Western notion of a death god entered Japan, and  started to become mentioned as an existence with a human nature.

Other than that, in Kyōhō 5 (1720), in a performance of The Love Suicides at Amijima, there was the expression, "of one possessed by a god of death".

Classical literature

In the classical literature of the Edo period,  that would possess humans are mentioned. Acting jointly with the malicious intent already within people who were living, those people were led on bad paths, which caused repeat incidents to occur at places where there was previously a murder incident (for example by causing the same suicide at places where people have hanged themselves before), and thus these  are somewhat like a possession that would cause people to want to die.

In the later Edo Period, the essay  in Kaei 3 (1850) by the essayist Miyoshi Shōzan, the one titled "upon possession by a shinigami, it becomes difficult to speak, or easier to tell lies" was a story where a prostitute possessed by a  invites a man to commit double suicide, and in the kabuki  by Kawatake Mokuami in Meiji 19 (1886), a  enters into people's thoughts, making them think about bad things they have done and want to die. These are, rather than gods, more like  (meaning ghosts and ), or evil spirits.

Folk religion
 are also spoken about in folk religion after the war. According to the mores of Miyajima, Kumamoto Prefecture, those who go out and return to attend to someone through the night must drink tea or eat a bowl of rice before sleeping, and it is said that a  would visit if this was ignored.

In the Hamamatsu area, Shizuoka Prefecture, a  would possess people and lead them to mountains, seas, and railroads where people have died. In those places, the dead would have a "death turn", and as long as there is nobody to die there next, they shall never ascend even if they were given a service, and it was said that people who were alive would be invited by the dead to come next. However, once one has visited the grave in sunset, then it would become necessary to visit the grave again during sunrise, to avoid a  possessing one's body. With this background of folk belief, it is also thought that sometimes people would consider the ghosts of the deceased, who have nobody to deify them, to be seeking companions and inviting people to join them.

See also

 Death (personification) - personifications of death
 Psychopomp - any entity that guides the souls of the dead to the afterlife
Death-related entities in other cultures
 Ankou - the equivalent in Celtic mythology
 Azrael - the angel of death in Abrahamic religions
  - Chinese angels of death
 Kṣitigarbha - Bodhisattva of hell-beings
 Thanatos - the god of death in Greek mythology
 King Yama - judge of the dead who presides over Narakas
 Yanluo Wang - ruler of Youdu
Shinigami in modern fiction
 Black Butler
 Full Moon Wo Sagashite
 Bleach
 Death Note
 Soul Eater
 So, I Can't Play H!
 Descendants of Darkness
 Rin-ne
 Yu Yu Hakusho
 Omishi Magical Theater: Risky Safety

Notes

References
 
 
 
 
 
 
 

 
Japanese gods
Japanese ghosts
Shinto kami
Psychopomps
Death gods